Mancha may refer to:

Arts and Entertainment
 Garbancito de la Mancha, 1945 Spanish animated film
 Rocío de la Mancha, 1963 album by Rocío Dúrcal
 Rocío from La Mancha, 1963 Spanish film
 Man of La Mancha, 1965 musical based on 17th century novel Don Quixote
 L'Homme de la Mancha, 1968 album by Jacques Brel
 Man of La Mancha (film), 1972 film based on the 17th century novel Don Quixote
 La Leyenda de la Mancha, 1998 album by Mägo de Oz
 Lost in La Mancha, 2002 documentary film
 La vida mancha, 2003 Spanish drama film
 Daily Bir Chattagram Mancha, Bengali newspaper

People
 Don Quijote de la Mancha, fictional protagonist of Spanish 17th century novel Don Quixote
 Vaughn Mancha (1921-2011), American football player
 Rodrigo Mancha (born 1986), Brazilian football defensive midfielder
 Caio Mancha (born 1992), Brazilian football forward
 Eduardo Mancha (born 1995), Brazilian football centre-back
 Mancha (footballer) (born 2001), full name Gianluca Piola Minozzo, Brazilian football left-back
 Victor Mancha, fictional Marvel comics superhero

Places
 La Mancha, historic region in Spain
 Mancha Húmeda, Spanish wetland
 La Mancha (DO), Spanish vine-growing region
 Castilla–La Mancha, autonomous community in Spain
 Castilla–La Mancha Bridge, Spanish bridge
 Mancha Real, city in Jaén, Spain
 Mancha-Centro, comarca of Albacete, Spain
 Mancha Blanca, village in Tinago, Spain
 Mancha Alta Albaceteña, comarca in Province of Albacete, Spain
 Tarazona de la Mancha, municipality in Albacete, Spain
 Mancha del Júcar, comarca in Province of Albacete, Spain
 Mancha Júcar-Centro, comarca in Province of Albacete, Spain
 Girish Mancha, theatre in Bagbazar, India
 Sukanta Mancha, auditorium in Kolkata, India
 Nazrul Mancha, auditorium in Kolkata, India
 Sisir Mancha, auditorium in Kolkata, India
 Ramgopal Mancha, auditorium in Howrah, India
 Madhusudan Mancha, auditorium in Dhakuria, India
 Mancha Khiri District, district in Khon Kaen Province, Thailand

Other uses
 La Mancha Negra, mysterious substance that oozed on Venezuelan roads
 Atlético Mancha Real, Spanish football club
 CS La Mancha, Congolese football club
 Mancha Verde, nickname for fans of Brazilian football club Palmeiras

See also
 Manche, coastal department in Normany, France